Gyronchus is an extinct genus of prehistoric ray-finned fish from the Jurassic.

See also

 Prehistoric fish
 List of prehistoric bony fish

External links
 Bony fish in the online Sepkoski Database

Jurassic bony fish
Pycnodontiformes genera
Jurassic fish of North America